The Swan Districts Football Club, nicknamed the Swans, is an Australian rules football club playing in the West Australian Football League (WAFL) and WAFL Women's (WAFLW). The club is based at Bassendean Oval, in Bassendean, an eastern suburb of Perth, Western Australia. The club was formed in 1932, and joined the then-Western Australian National Football League (WANFL) in 1934, acting as a successor to the Midland Junction Football Club, which had disbanded during World War I, in the Perth Hills region.

History

Swan Districts finished seventh on the WANFL ladder winning seven out of 21 games in their debut season in 1934. The presence of established WANFL players like inaugural captain-coach "Judda" Bee from East Fremantle and Fred Sweetapple from West Perth was critical to the fledgling club's competitiveness. In 1935, Swans finished sixth on the WANFL Ladder with six wins and twelve losses and George Krepp won the Sandover Medal. The 1936 season saw the Swans pick up nine wins and eleven losses but still finish seventh on the League Ladder.

The 1937 season saw Swan Districts, under new coach Jim Ditchburn, finish in third place on the League Ladder with 14 wins and 7 losses, and play in their first finals series. Ted Holdsworth kicked 109 goals in the first 14 games before injury ended his season and East Perth beat them in the first semi-final 13.9 (87) to 11.7 (73). Swan Districts had another good season in 1938, finishing third with 11 wins and nine losses but were again beaten in the first semi-final by East Perth 8.18 (66) – 9.11 (65).

In 1939, with the loss of champion spearhead Holdsworth to Kalgoorlie, Swans slid to sixth on the ladder with seven wins from twenty games. In the following two seasons, despite Holdsworth's return, the club slid still further to finish last with only two wins in 1940 and three in 1941. Due to the Second World War the WANFL suspended its senior competition and implemented an under age competition to replace it. In 1942 Swans were unable to raise a side to play and did not compete at all. By 1943 Swan Districts assembled a side to compete in the under-age competition and performed exceedingly well, finishing fourth on the ladder with nine wins and eight losses, then winning the first semi-final against West Perth and the preliminary Final against Subiaco. Swans thus played in their first Grand Final only to be defeated by East Fremantle, the final score being East Fremantle 17.15 (117) to Swan Districts 11.11 (77). Jim Davies became the second Swan Districts player to win a Sandover Medal in 1944 with 33 votes in what was otherwise a forgettable season with Swans finishing sixth on the ladder, but in the restored open-age competition of 1945 their fortunes improved as they finished fourth on the league ladder only to be defeated in the first semi-final by South Fremantle.

However, Swan Districts fell off dramatically for the next fifteen seasons. During this period they never finished higher than sixth of eight teams, and overall won only sixty-one and drew one of their 301 matches, suffering from the fact that much of the area around Bassendean was "un-allotted" so that players such as Keith and Roy Harper, and Frank Coulson moved to more successful clubs. They were nonetheless instrumental in having the WANFL introduce its "Provident Fund" to allow league revenue to be shared amongst the clubs. In 1957 Swan Districts won their first Colts Premiership, repeating the dose in 1958, and these teams provided the nucleus of their successes in the early to middle 1960s.

After finishing last in 1960, Swan Districts appointed Haydn Bunton junior as senior captain-coach in early 1961, and improvement was immediate. Swan Districts won twelve and drew two of their twenty-one regular season matches to be a clear second and an ingenious tactic by Bunton against champion East Perth ruckman "Polly" Farmer won them a huge upset in the Grand Final, and two more premierships followed in 1962 and 1963. Swans' fall afterwards was however just as rapid as their rise from 1960 to 1961. In 1964 Swans won seven of their first nine matches, but then state representative calls and form lapses affected the team so badly that they won only two of their final twelve encounters. After achieving their most successful home-and-away season under new captain coach Fred Castledine before being overwhelmed by a mediocre East Fremantle team in the 1965 Grand Final, they fell off completely in the following eight seasons. Swans in this era were hindered by the lack of a full-time coach or secretary that made it harder for them to recruit than other WANFL clubs. In 1968, Swan Districts came nearer to a winless season than any team in senior WA(N)FL competition between 1918 and 1998: winning only one game after the siren by a point against East Fremantle, and scored their all-time lowest score against East Perth. Swan Districts were also last in 1970 and 1971, and not until 1974 did they again make the finals, under the coaching of Jack Ensor, who most unusually never played senior League Football. Again, however, they declined abruptly, falling to wooden spooners in 1977 and 1978.

John Todd, who took the coaching reins at Bassendean in 1977 and began with a big clean-out of players, brought with him a new winning culture, one which would emulate that of the Haydn Bunton era. By the 1980s, Swans became the dominant side in the WAFL, winning three straight flags in 1982, 1983 and 1984. Swan Districts fell drastically to be last in 1986 and 1988, but rose equally rapidly and after a stint coaching the West Coast Eagles in 1988 and 1989, Todd returned to the club and after being fifth with ten wins in 1989 they won a seventh premiership, beating Claremont 16.7 (103) to 10.17 (77). However, after several unsuccessful finals campaigns between 1991 and 1994 Todd returned to South Fremantle, where he began his football career, and Swan Districts fell rapidly downhill on and off the field under coaches Graham Melrose (1995 and 1996), Phil Cronan (1997 and 1998), Peter Wilson (1999) and Todd again from 2000 to 2002. Between 1995 and 2002 they did not play in the finals and overall won only 51 of 158 games.

At the end of 2002, a season where Swans ran last in all three grades and were as lucky as in 1968 to escape a winless season in the seniors, the club's desperate financial trouble came to the public's attention and a concerted financial drive saw them rise to ten wins and a draw under new coach Steve Turner, and back into the finals in 2004 and 2005. They could not challenge Subiaco or South Fremantle for the flag, and in 2006 fell to only seven wins before Turner gave way to former Eagles star Chris Lewis early in 2007. Brian Dawson took over as coach of the seniors in 2008 and the club rebounded from disappointing results in the previous two years to play in the 2008 Grand Final which they lost to Subiaco. Dawson then steered the team to a preliminary final in 2009. Dawson announced his retirement at the end of the 2010 season. then took the team to the Grand Final which they won over Claremont by a single point. Andrew Krakouer won the Simpson Medal on top of winning the Sandover Medal for 2010, he accumulated 42 possessions during the grand final and kicked the last goal of the game ensuring Swan won the flag. Josh Roberts will be remembered as the premiership skipper in his first year as captain.

Greg Harding was appointed as senior coach for the 2011 season. The club had a poor season finishing the season with only six wins from twenty games and finishing second from bottom of the league ladder, but rebounded in 2012 to finish second to a powerful Claremont combination only to lose both finals.

In 2013 Swans finished 3rd on the ladder with Tim Geappen kicking 49 goals for the season and Tony Notte being awarded the fairest and best.

Swan Districts were a foundation member of the WAFL Women's competition in 2019.

Club song
The Swan Districts club song is to the tune of the 1926 song Baby Face written by Harry Akst and Benny Davis.
The club song lyrics were written by John Watts.

Black and whites,
We're the black and whites

We're all right,
We are the mighty fighting black and whites
There's not another team to match our pace,
Take our place
The Swan boys are jumping
We sure have started something
Here we come
Our banners fly on high to show that we have won
We play with all our might
Because we're full of fight
We're the famous
Black and whites

Black and whites,
We're the black and whites

Black and whites,
We're the black and whites

Here we come
Our banners fly out high to show that we have won
We play with all our might
Because we're full of fight
We're the famous
Black and whites

We're all right,
We are the mighty fighting black and whites
There's not another team to match our pace,
Take our place
The Swan boys are jumping
We sure have started something
Here we come
Our banners fly on high to show that we have won
We play with all our might
Because we're full of fight
We're the famous
Black and whites

Honours

Club honours

Individual honours
Sandover Medallists: George Krepp 1935, Jim Davies 1944, Haydn Bunton Junior 1962, Bill Walker 1965–1967 & 1970, Phil Narkle 1982, Mick Grasso 1990, Jeremy Wasley 1996, Shane Beros 2003, Andrew Krakouer 2010, Samuel Fisher 2020.

Most Games: Bill Walker 305

Record Home Attendance: 22,350 v West Perth, 19 May 1980

League premiership teams

1961 Finals Swan Districts lost the second semi final to East Perth, then beat Subiaco in the Preliminary Final to win through to the Grand Final

1961 Grand Final Swan Districts 17.9 (111) defeated East Perth 12.15 (87)

1961 premiership team

1962 Finals Swan Districts defeat East Fremantle in the second semi final.

1962 Grand Final Swan Districts 14.10 (94) defeated East Fremantle 10.16 (76)

1962 premiership team

1963 Finals Swan Districts defeat East Perth in the first semi final, then Swan Districts defeat Perth in the Preliminary Final

1963 Grand Final Swan Districts 17.10 (112) defeated East Fremantle 13.12 (90)

1963 premiership team

1982 Finals Swan Districts defeat Claremont in the second semi final

1982 Grand Final Swan Districts 18.19 (127) defeated Claremont 11.12 (78)

1982 premiership team

1983 Finals Swan Districts defeat East Fremantle in the first semi final, then Swan Districts defeat South Fremantle in Preliminary Final

1983 Grand Final Swan Districts 15.14 (104) defeated Claremont 12.11 (83)

1983 premiership team

1984 Finals East Fremantle defeat Swan Districts in the second semi final, then Swan Districts defeat Claremont in Preliminary Final

1984 Grand Final Swan Districts 20.18 (138) defeated East Fremantle 15.12 (102)

1984 premiership team

1990 Finals Claremont defeat Swan Districts in the second semi final, then Swan Districts defeat South Fremantle in Preliminary Final

1990 Grand Final Swan Districts 16.7 (103) defeated Claremont 10.17 (77)

1990 premiership team

2010 Finals Claremont defeat Swan Districts in the second semi final, then Swan Districts defeat East Perth in Preliminary Final

2010 Grand Final Swan Districts 14.16 (100) defeated Claremont 14.15 (99)

2010 premiership team

Hall of Fame
The Swan Districts Football Club Hall of Fame was established in 2016 to "recognise and enshrine players, coaches, administrators, volunteers and iconic moments that have made a most significant contribution to the Swan Districts Football Club ... since its inception in 1934."
In the initial terms of reference document, there were to be four main categories for entries into the Hall of Fame: 
 Hall of Fame inductees (open to all players, coaches, administrators and volunteers); 
 Champion inductees (open to those SDFC players who have been recruited from SDFC into the AFL); 
 Legends – open to all Hall of Fame members; and 
 Iconic Moments, which were defined as "events which have been game changers for the Club. These could include football games, football events, infrastructure changes and innovations".

However, subsequent coverage of the club's Hall of Fame barely references these categories, and the reference to the Legends category was modified to "Immortals". The inaugural in take of the Swan Districts Hall of Fame included 26 individuals and one iconic moment. There were further induction ceremonies held in 2019 and 2021.

 Players with names in bold are also in the Western Australian Football Hall of Fame
 Players with an asterisk* next to their names are also in the Australian Football Hall of Fame

Team of the Century

List of Swan Districts footballers who have played in the VFL/AFL
For many years, Swan Districts has provided many footballers who have excelled at VFL/AFL level, with a notable number who are of Indigenous Australian heritage. This list only counts footballers who played at least game at senior VFL/AFL level and who were recruited / drafted from Swan Districts.

West Coast representatives
 Don Holmes, 1987–1989: 23 games, 40 goals
 Phil Narkle, 1987, 1990: 18 games, 18 goals
 Murray Rance, 1988–1990: 57 games, 7 goals, club captain 1989
 Troy Ugle, 1988–1993: 43 games, 43 goals
 Jason Ball, 1992–1999: 103 games, 114 goals, AFL Premiership 1994
 Scott Cummings, 1999–2001: 46 games, 158 goals, Coleman Medal 1999
 Andrew Embley, 1999–2013: 250 games, 216 goals, AFL Premiership 2006, Norm Smith Medal 2006
 Adam Hunter, 2000–2009: 151 games, 86 goals, AFL Premiership 2006
 Nic Naitanui, 2009–current: 204 games, 110 goals, 2× All-Australian (2012, 2020)
 Lewis Jetta, 2016–2020: 75 games, 17 goals, AFL Premiership 2018

Fremantle representatives
 Travis Edmonds, 1995: 1 game, 0 goals
 Michael Walters, 2009–current: 181 games, 290 goals, All-Australian 2019
 Rory Lobb, 2019–current: 41 games, 35 goals

Club record goal kickers 

Eric Gorman – 555
Ted Holdsworth – 532
Bill Walker – 456
Tim Geappen – 371
Don Holmes – 323
Troy Ugle – 312
Simon Beasley – 293
Andy Holmes – 277
Kevin Caton – 274
Mark Olsen – 268
Brent Hutton – 256

Ted Holdsworth was the first Swan Districts player to kick more than 100 goals.
The most goals ever kicked in a season by a Swan Districts player was by Simon Beasley in 1981 when he kicked 119 goals, although Warren Ralph kicked 120 goals for Claremont and won the Bernie Naylor Medal.

Bernie Naylor Medallists 
The Bernie Naylor Medal is awarded to the leading goal kicker in the WAFL.
Max George was the first Swan Districts player to top the WAFL goal kickers list and win the award when he kicked 90 goals during the 1974 season.
Simon Beasley shared the Bernie Naylor Medal in 1980 with Warren Ralph of Claremont (97 goals)
Brent Hutton won the award in 1984 (83 goals) and Kevin Caton won it again in 1992 (51 goals).

Swan Medallists
The Swan Medal is awarded to the best and fairest player at Swan Districts. Multiple award winners include:
5-time winners
Bill Walker: 1965, 1966, 1968, 1969 and 1970
Travis Edmonds: 1992, 1993, 1997, 2000 and 2001
3-time winners
George Krepp: 1934, 1935 and 1936
Douglas Anderson: 1946,1948 and 1951
Keith Slater: 1956, 1957 and 1960
Haydn Bunton Jr.:1961, 1962 and 1963
Peter Manning: 1967, 1971 and 1973
Keith Narkle: 1977, 1978 and 1984
2-time winners
Sydney Sinclair: 1938 and 1945
Joseph Pearce: 1949 and 1950
Garry Sidebottom: 1976 and 1975
Gerard Neesham: 1979 and 1980
Phillip Narkle: 1981 and 1988
Joel Cornelius: 1998 and 1999
Shane Beros: 2003 and 2005
Adam Lange: 2004 and 2006
Josh Roberts: 2008 and 2009
Matt Riggio: 2015 and 2016
Tony Notte:  2013 and 2018

See also
Wikipedia listing of Swan Districts Football Club players

Notes
The ten losses East Fremantle suffered is, equal with East Perth in 1936, SANFL club Glenelg in 1986 and Adelaide in the 1998 AFL season, the most by an eventual premier in a major Australian Rules competition.

References

External links

 Official Website of the Swan Districts Football Club
 Full Points Footy History of Swan Districts

 
West Australian Football League clubs
WAFL Women's
Australian rules football clubs in Western Australia
Australian rules football clubs established in 1932
1932 establishments in Australia